Čuvar tajni (trans. The Keeper of Secrets) is the fifth studio album by Serbian heavy metal band Kraljevski Apartman. Čuvar tajni is the band's only album recorded with vocalist Ivan Đerković.

The album features a new version of the song "Jesen", originally released on Kraljevski Apartman's second album Izgubljen u vremenu.

Track listing 
All songs written by Zoran Zdravković.

Personnel 
Ivan Đerković - vocals
Zoran Zdravković - guitar
Miloš Nikolić - guitar
Marko Nikolić - bass guitar
Zoran Radovanović - drums

References

Čuvar tajni at Discogs

External links
Čuvar tajni at Discogs

Kraljevski Apartman albums
2008 albums
PGP-RTS albums